Appointment for Love is a 1941 romantic comedy film directed by William A. Seiter and starring Charles Boyer and Margaret Sullavan. It was made by Universal Pictures.

It was nominated for the Academy Award for Best Sound, Recording (Bernard B. Brown).

Cast
 Charles Boyer as Andre 'Pappy' Cassil
 Margaret Sullavan as Dr. Jane Alexander
 Rita Johnson as Nancy Benson
 Eugene Pallette as George Hastings
 Ruth Terry as Edith Meredith
 Reginald Denny as Michael Dailey
 Cecil Kellaway as O'Leary
 J.M. Kerrigan as Timothy
 Roman Bohnen as Dr. Gunther
 Gus Schilling as Gus
 Virginia Brissac as Nora
 Mary Gordon as Martha
 Erskine Sanford as Hastings' Butler (uncredited)  
 Dale Van Sickel as Ambulance Driver (uncredited)

References

External links
 
 
 

1941 films
American black-and-white films
1940s English-language films
Films directed by William A. Seiter
Films based on short fiction
Universal Pictures films
1941 romantic comedy films
American romantic comedy films
Films scored by Frank Skinner
1940s American films